Winter Morning Walks is a studio album by Maria Schneider and Dawn Upshaw. The album won the Grammy Award for Best Classical Contemporary Composition and Grammy Award for Best Engineered Album, Classical in 2014.

Reception
Vincent Plush of The Australian wrote "Schneider's music hails from the glorious American tradition of song-setting from Gershwin to Sondheim, framed in the open prairie sonorities of Copland and gentle jazz-inflected barbs of John Adams. It flows in an unbroken expressive stream, lyrical and ingratiating to the ear. Her melodies elevate Kooser's prosaic lines, suggesting an opera composer of uncommon promise".

Fred Kaplan of Stereophile stated: "This is gorgeous music. There are shards and strands of Copland, Sondheim, Barber, and Ives, though the sound is distinctively Schneider, who is ever-evolving into a composer of—beyond genre—Great American Music".

References 

2013 albums
Big band albums
Jazz albums by American artists
Maria Schneider (musician) albums